Claremorris is a town in County Mayo in the west of Ireland, at the junction of the N17 and the N60 national routes. It is the fastest growing town in the county. There was a 31% increase in the town's population between 2006 and 2011 and a 23% increase between 2002 and 2006. The population of Claremorris in the 2016 Census was 3,687, rising from 3,412 in the 2011 Census.

The town sits at the bottom of a valley, all roads leading to the town follow hills, in particular the old Knock road (known as the Knock hill) and Courthouse road. Although low-lying, the town does not experience flooding. There is no major river through the town although there are two lakes in the town centre: Clare Lough where the 'Land of the Giants' amenity is located and Mayfield Lough. A small river flows between the two.

History

The town derived its name from Maurice de Prendergast, a Norman who came to Ireland in 1169.

The town was established during the 18th century. In 1822 the Roman Catholic Chapel was built, which was later demolished to make way for the town hall. The present Roman Catholic Church St Colman's Church, was built in 1911. St. John's Anglican Church, now the town library, was built in 1828.

The main landlord family in Claremorris was the Browne family, one of whom, the Hon. Denis Browne (1760-1828), was High Sheriff of Mayo during the Irish Rebellion of 1798 and acquired the nickname of "Donnchadha an Ropa" (Denis the Rope) as a result of his treatment of captured Irish patriots.

Demographics
At the 2016 Census, Claremorris had a total population of 3,687 people, consisting of 1,720 males and 1,967 females. 24.3% percent of the population were non-Irish nationals and 89.7% of the resident population had lived at the same address as for the year before. Catholics constituted 82.9% of the population.

Genealogical records for Claremorris consist of Roman Catholic church records of marriage which commenced in 1805 and baptisms which commenced in 1825.  Church of Ireland records consist of baptisms from 1834 onwards, marriages from 1846 onwards and burials from 1878 onwards.  These are held at the South Mayo Family Research Centre in Ballinrobe.

Historical population

Amenities

Retail outlets in the area include the Silverbridge Shopping Centre. Supermarkets in the town include Aldi, Supervalu, Lidl, Certa and Tesco.

There are three hotels including the four-star McWilliam Park Hotel, which opened in 2006. The town also has several restaurants and many pubs. The town has two nightclubs, Rumours and Diceys.

A swimming pool and leisure centre opened on 1 September 2009. A Garda Síochána Station opened in 2008.

There are two secondary schools: St. Colman's College for boys and Mount St. Michaels for girls. There are also two primary schools, Scoil Mhuire Gan Smál and Claremorris Boys N.S.. Gaelscoil Uileog de Búrca, in nearby Loughanamon, provides primary education through the Irish language. 

Local events include Claremorris Open Exhibition (an annual arts exhibition in the town held since 1978), and the Claremorris Drama Festival (an annual drama festival held since 1970).

McMahon Park - Clare Lake is located just beside the town. It has tree-lined walks, angling platforms and areas suitable for picnicking. It's also home to Land of the Giants, a children's attraction.

Claremorris has long been known by locals for its great fishing. With Clare Lake being the most famous, Lough Nanannagh and Lough Gort na Bealtaine (where pike up to five foot long have been caught) are two spots especially populated with pike, perch and eel. The River Robe just outside the town has good stock of wild brown trout and the Robe's tributaries are also hold a stable stock of smaller trout.

Sports
There is a number of sporting clubs including:
 Claremorris GAA, compete at levels from under-10s up to senior in both men's and ladies' competitions. The club have been Mayo senior hurling champions twice (1968 and 1971) and senior county Gaelic football champions four times (1961, 1964, 1965 and 1971).
 A swimming club trains at the Claremorris Leisure Centre, and incorporates water polo. The club was the first from Connacht to win the all-Ireland under 16 & under 19 boys championships, as well as being the first club to win the inaugural girls under-16 and under-19 championships.
 The Claremorris Leisure Centre opened in 2009 and has a 25-metre, 6 lane, short course competition pool. It also has a gymnasium and fitness studio.
 A soccer club trains and plays matches at Concannon park.
 There is a local 18-hole golf course outside Claremorris on the Galway Road.
 An athletics club trains on a newly developed mondo athletics track.
 Claremorris Colts RFC was established in 2009 and meets at the Mount St Michael Convent Girls School pitch. The club has teams in underage grades. In April 2012 Claremorris Colts RFC was awarded the title of 'Club of the Year 2012' by the Connacht Branch of the IRFU.

Transport

Road

Claremorris is situated at a major road junction. The N17 (Galway-Sligo road) and the N60 (Castlebar-Roscommon road) meet in the town.

The town was once a major traffic bottleneck.

Claremorris ground to a halt every afternoon, (particularly Fridays), when the busy N17 slowly negotiated the old bank corner which consisted of a sharp right hand bend. By the late 1990s, over 13,000 vehicles passed through the town daily.

In 1994 a design for the bypass was completed by Mayo County Council. The compulsory purchase order went ahead in 1995, followed by a three-year wait for funding allocation for the scheme. Eventually in 1998 the go-ahead was given and construction of the bypass commenced. The N17 bypass opened in July 2001. Journey times at peak periods were reduced by 30 minutes on the Galway/Sligo route after the opening. The project was built as a grade separated single carriageway (motorway style interchanges) which is unusual for single carriageway bypasses in Ireland. The new 16 km road bypassed one of Ireland’s most treacherous national routes, the original  stretch between Claremorris and Knock had a very high accident rate due to its poor alignment. The busy N60 still passes through the town via an inner relief road. A second bypass for the town is included in the proposed new N60 road to Castlebar, in 2011 the NRA suspended this road development due to government cutbacks.

Railways

Claremorris railway station is served by the Dublin Galway/Westport line as well as the Ballina Branch Line to Ballina. There is currently a campaign underway to open the Western Railway Corridor through Claremorris linking Limerick to Sligo. The Claremorris-Tuam phase was due to open in 2014 but is indefinitely postponed.

Weather station
Claremorris is home to one of Ireland's eight inland weather observing stations, located 2 kilometres from the town centre. It began recording weather in November 1943 and was run and staffed by a local family. During WWII Ireland provided detailed weather reports to the Allies. Weather reports from Claremorris and Blacksod Lighthouse (located on the west coast of Mayo) played a significant factor in selecting the date of launch for the invasion of France (D Day) on 6 June 1944. Many will remember the weather expert in the film "The Longest Day", imparting this information to Gen. Eisenhower and the Joint Chiefs of Staff. In 1949 it was decided that the Irish Meteorological Service needed observations on an hourly basis from inland stations like Claremorris. It was decided to staff the station with full-time permanent personnel. In 1996 staff were relocated to Ireland West Airport Knock and it now operates automatically with data uploaded to Dublin .

Climate
Claremorris has a temperate oceanic climate with cold winters and warm damp summers. The coldest months being January and February and the wettest being December and October. Claremorris received roughly 1,500 hours of sunshine in 2010.  Climate in this area has mild differences between highs and lows, and there is adequate rainfall year-round.  The Köppen Climate Classification subtype for this climate is "Cfb" (Marine West Coast Climate/Oceanic climate).

Notable people

Claremorris is the birthplace of:

Patrick Cassidy, orchestral, choral, and film score composer.

Lucinda Creighton, former Teachta Dála and Minister of State for European Affairs.

John Cardinal D'Alton, Primate of All Ireland and Archbishop of Armagh, 1946–1963.

Edward Delaney, sculptor.

John Gray, physician, surgeon, journalist, newspaper proprietor, and MP for Kilkenny City.

John Hegarty, 44th Provost of Trinity College, Dublin.

Conor Maguire, lawyer, revolutionary, politician, Attorney General, Chief Justice of Ireland, Judge at the European Court of Human Rights, Chairman Irish Red Cross.

Greg Maher, footballer.

Delia Murphy, Singer and collector of Irish ballads.

Catherine Noone, former senator.

See also
 Claremorris church
 List of towns and villages in Ireland

References

External links

Claremorris Chamber of Commerce
Claremorris

Towns and villages in County Mayo